Amir Hossein Amiri; is an Iranian football midfielder who plays for Paykan in the Iran Pro League.

Club career

Early years
He joined Moghavemat Tehran U21 in 2012 and spent two season with them. He helped Moghavemat in winning the 2013–14 Tehran Asia Vision U21 Premier League.

Paykan
Nemati joined Paykan in summer 2014. he made his debut for Paykan on September 26, 2014 against Padideh as a substitute for Muamer Svraka.

Club career statistics

References

External links
 Amir Hossein Amiri at PersianLeague.com
 Amir Hossein Amiri  at IranLeague.ir

Living people
Iranian footballers
Paykan F.C. players
1994 births
Association football midfielders